Drew Fudenberg (born March 2, 1957) is  a Professor of Economics at MIT. His extensive research spans many aspects of game theory, including equilibrium theory, learning in games, evolutionary game theory, and many applications to other fields. Fudenberg was also one of the first to apply game theoretic analysis in industrial organization, bargaining theory, and contract theory. He has also authored papers on repeated games, reputation effects, and behavioral economics.

Biography
Fudenberg obtained his A.B. in applied mathematics from Harvard University in 1978, when he went on to obtain his Ph.D. in Economics from the Massachusetts Institute of Technology. After completing his Ph.D. in just three years, he began his assistant professorship at the University of California, Berkeley in 1981. At Berkeley, Fudenberg was tenured at the age of 28. In 1987, he returned to a faculty position at MIT, where he taught for 6 years. In 1993, Fudenberg accepted a faculty position in the Economics department of his alma mater, Harvard University. He has returned once more to MIT as the Paul A. Samuelson Professor of Economics as of 2016.

Fudenberg was the associate editor of the Journal of Economic Theory from 1984 to 1996; the Quarterly Journal of Economics from 1984 to 1989; Econometrica from 1985 to 1996; Games and Economic Behavior from 1988 to 1993, and the foreign editor of the Review of Economic Studies from 1993 to 1996. He was also the principal editor of Econometrica from 1996 until 2000.

Fudenberg has authored a number of books on game theory, including Game Theory with Jean Tirole, a primary reference for graduate students in economics; Dynamic Models of Oligopoly, also with Jean Tirole; and Theory of Learning in Games with David K. Levine.

Fudenberg received the Guggenheim Fellowship in 1990 and became a fellow of the American Academy of Arts and Sciences in 1998.

He is the son of immunologist and anti-vaccination activist Hugh Fudenberg.

Publications
 Game Theory, coauthor with Jean Tirole
 Dynamic Models of Oligopoly coauthor with Jean Tirole
 A Long-Run Collaboration on Long-Run Games, coauthor with David K. Levine
 Theory of Learning in Games, coauthor with David K. Levine

References

External links
 Drew Fudenberg at MIT Department of Economics
 Biography of Drew Fudenberg at MIT Economics Department

Living people
Game theorists
University of California, Berkeley College of Letters and Science faculty
MIT School of Humanities, Arts, and Social Sciences faculty
Harvard University faculty
1957 births
Harvard College alumni
MIT School of Humanities, Arts, and Social Sciences alumni
Fellows of the Econometric Society
Presidents of the Econometric Society
Fellows of the American Academy of Arts and Sciences
20th-century American economists
21st-century American economists
Economics journal editors
Nancy L. Schwartz Memorial Lecture speakers